The second annual Konami Cup Asia Series was held in November 2006 with four teams participating.  The champions from the domestic leagues in Japan, South Korea, Taiwan along with an all-star team from China took part in the competition. All games were held in the Tokyo Dome in Japan. The tournament was sponsored by the Nippon Professional Baseball Association and Konami. The Hokkaido Nippon Ham Fighters defeated the La New Bears in the title game to win the championship for Japan. Starting pitcher Yu Darvish was named the MVP of the series.

Participating teams
 China Baseball League (China): China Stars, an all-star team of China Baseball League of China.
 Nippon Professional Baseball (Japan): Hokkaido Nippon Ham Fighters, winner of 2006 Japan Series.  Based in Sapporo, Japan.
 Korea Baseball Organization (Korea): Samsung Lions, winner of 2006 Korea Series.  Based in Daegu, South Korea.
 Chinese Professional Baseball League (Taiwan): La New Bears, winner of 2006 Taiwan Series.  Based in Kaohsiung, Taiwan.

Matchups
All times are Japan Standard Time (UTC+9)

November 9

Attendance: 2,127    Time: 2:37
Note: Game ended due to mercy rule.

Attendance: 15,147    Time: 3:14

November 10

Attendance: 2,024    Time: 2:27
Note: Game ended due to mercy rule.

Attendance: 11,038    Time: 2:43

November 11

Attendance: 12,337    Time: 2:46

Attendance: 6,445    Time: 2:57

Round-Robin Standings

Championship, November 12

Attendance: 24,580    Time: 2:33

External links
KONAMI CUP Asia Series

Asia Series
Asia
International baseball competitions hosted by Japan
Sports competitions in Tokyo
Asia Series
Asia Series
Asia Series